Scopus may refer to:

 Scopus, a bibliographic database for science
 Scopus (journal), a journal of East Africa ornithology 
 Scopus (bird), the sole genus in the Scopidae bird family
 Mount Scopus, a mountain in northeast Jerusalem
 Scopus Township, Bollinger County, Missouri, a U.S. town

See also
 Scope (disambiguation)
 Skopos (disambiguation)